Sovetskaya was a Soviet research station in Kaiser Wilhelm II Land in Antarctica that was established on 16 February 1958 and closed on 3 January 1959.

Reached on 16 February 1958 by the 3rd Soviet Antarctic Expedition for International Geophysical Year research work, it closed on 3 January 1959. Its WMO reporting ID was 89557.

See also
Sovetskaya (lake)
 List of Antarctic research stations
 List of Antarctic field camps

Sources 

Outposts of Antarctica
Polar exploration by Russia and the Soviet Union
Outposts of Kaiser Wilhelm II Land
Soviet Union and the Antarctic
1959 disestablishments in the Soviet Union
1959 disestablishments in Antarctica
1958 establishments in Antarctica